Matt Loughran is an American musician, songwriter, and guitarist who is best known as a founding member and former lead guitarist of the American rock band, Cold. He is now the lead guitarist for a band in Jacksonville, Florida called Dawn Patrol.

Career

Grundig
In 1986, Loughran formed the band Grundig, which would later be known as Cold, along with several other students; Scooter Ward, Jeremy Marshall, and Sam McCandless at Fletcher High School in Neptune Beach, Florida. The band played their first gig in 1990 at a club called the Spray. In 1992, Loughran left the band.

Cold
In September of 2004, Loughran rejoined Grundig, which the band was now renamed Cold, and helped them record their fourth studio album, A Different Kind of Pain, which was released on August 30, 2005. Loughran remained in the band until they disbanded on November 17, 2006.

Dawn Patrol
Since his departure from Cold, Loughran has been the lead guitarist for the Jacksonville, Florida band, Dawn Patrol.

Discography
Cold

A Different Kind of Pain (2005)

References

Year of birth missing (living people)
Living people
American heavy metal guitarists
Lead guitarists
Duncan U. Fletcher High School alumni